Štvanice stadium was a sports stadium situated on Štvanice Island, Czech Republic, and was ranked among the oldest stadiums in Prague. The stadium was in its heyday in the first half of the 20th century, but has been in decline since 1961. It was here, where in 1947 the Czechoslovak national team won the Ice Hockey World Championship for the first time.

Early days
Czech national ice hockey teams at first had to win five European titles, before players finally saw their first stadium with artificial ice rink. The stadium was built in the early 1930s and was entirely made of wood. On 17 January 1931, the first hockey match on the synthetic ice was played. After this, Štvanice stadium became the Ice skating centre of Prague for 30 years and countless numbers of hockey-players and figure skaters were brought up there.

The Štvanice stadium hosted four Ice Hockey World Championships. The Czechoslovak ice hockey team won a medal on each occasion:
 1933 (bronze)
 1938 (bronze)
 1947 (gold)
 1959 (bronze).

The next important date for the Stadium was 11 February 1955. The first televised hockey match was broadcast on this day.

Decline of Štvanice Arena
In 1961 a new arena at the fairground became home to HC Sparta Prague, although they continued to play there occasionally when booking conflicts arose. Subsequently, the rink at Štvanice started to grow old and waste away, and the stadium was only used by regional ice hockey clubs such as HC APeX Praha and for public skating. After several years the stadium had to be closed due to poor repair. As late as 1998, civil association APeX CLUB carried out repairs and Štvanice stadium was reopened. In 2000 Štvanice Arena was proclaimed a national cultural monument and was protected by the state.

In the 2002 European floods, a big part of the stadium was damaged. Thanks to APeX CLUB it was reopened in October 2002.

In 2008 the city denounced the contract to tenants due to not meeting contractual obligations to care. According to the report there was the danger of a structural collapse. Štvanice Stadium was finally demolished in May 2011.

References

External links
 
 Official website of Štvanice Stadium (in Czech)

Sports venues completed in 1930
Indoor ice hockey venues in the Czech Republic
Sports venues in Prague
Sports venues demolished in 2011
Demolished buildings and structures in the Czech Republic
1930 establishments in Czechoslovakia
2011 disestablishments in the Czech Republic
20th-century architecture in the Czech Republic